The 2009–10 Torquay United F.C. season was Torquay United's 74th season in the Football League and their first season in League Two after being promoted from the Conference National. The season runs from 1 July 2009 to 30 June 2010.

Overview
Despite a 2–0 win over Chesterfield providing an encouraging start to the season, the Gulls soon stumbled upon a run of bad form which saw them play eleven games in League Two without a win. They had slightly more success in the early rounds of the cup competitions; aside from an early exit to Crystal Palace in the Carling Cup, Torquay enjoyed emphatic 3–1 victories over Cheltenham Town in the first rounds of both the FA Cup and Johnstone Paints Trophy. But, while they were beaten on penalties in the second round of the latter competition by eventual winners Southampton, the Gulls were finally knocked out in the third round of the FA Cup by Brighton after achieving a convincing 4–0 win against Stockport County in the second round.

With relegation from League Two still a real threat in late March, Torquay finally found the winning formula at just the right time, winning six and drawing two of their last eight games. The most impressive display during this run was a 5–0 thrashing of league leaders Rochdale at Plainmoor, a result which earned Torquay the F&C Investments Performance Of The Week Award from the League Managers Association.  The dramatic upturn in the Gulls' on-field performances meant that their league survival was assured with three games to spare following a 3–0 victory away to relegation rivals Grimsby Town.  Remarkably, Torquay managed to keep a clean sheet in all of their last seven games of the season and, in the process, set a new club record of 691 minutes played without conceding a goal.

League statistics

League Two

Results summary

Results by round

Results

League Two

FA Cup

League Cup

League Trophy

Friendlies

Devon St Luke's Bowl

Club statistics

First team appearances

|}
Source: Torquay United

Top scorers

Source: Torquay United

Disciplinary Record

Source: Torquay United

Transfers

In

Out

Loans in

Loans out

Notes
. This match was played at a neutral venue due to the poor state of the pitch at Stockport's Edgeley Park ground.

References

Torquay United
Torquay United F.C. seasons